Ouled Harkat is a town and commune in Biskra Province, Algeria.

References

Communes of Biskra Province
Biskra Province